Hesse-Homburg was formed into a separate landgraviate in 1622 by the landgrave of Hesse-Darmstadt; it was to be ruled by his son, although it did not become independent of Hesse-Darmstadt until 1668. It was briefly divided into Hesse-Homburg and Hesse-Homburg-Bingenheim; but these parts were reunited in 1681.

History

In 1806, Hesse-Homburg was incorporated with Hesse-Darmstadt; but in 1815, by the Congress of Vienna, the latter state was compelled to recognize the independence of Hesse-Homburg, which was increased by the addition of Meisenheim. The landgraviate of Hesse-Homburg consisted of two parts, the district of Homburg on the right side of the Rhine, and the district of Meisenheim, added in 1815, on the left side of the same river.  Hesse-Homburg joined the German Confederation as a sovereign state on July 7, 1817. The Landgraviate was the only principality that was not one of the founding members of the Confederation, apart from the Duchy of Limburg ruled by the King of the Netherlands (added in 1839) and the Duchy of Schleswig (1848-1851) ruled by the Danish king. In 1848, the Landgraviate had a population of 22,800 and a total land area of 166 square miles, thus making it one of the smallest states in the German Confederation. Hesse-Homburg was represented by the Grand Duchy of Hesse in the Inner Council of the Confederate Diet, but had a seat of its own on the Plenary Council. The state joined the Zollverein in 1835.

In 1833, baths were opened in Homburg, which brought unexpected wealth and attention to the landgraviate. A casino and gambling saloons soon opened, which also contributed greatly to the state's burgeoning economy. Several legal overtures were made by the diet in an attempt to end gambling, but all attempts failed until after Hesse-Homburg passed into Prussian hands.

On 24 March 1866, Hesse-Homburg was inherited by the Grand-duke of Hesse-Darmstadt, while Meisenheim fell to Prussia. On 20 September of that same year, these territories were taken from Hesse-Darmstadt again, and the former landgraviate was combined with the Electorate of Hesse, Duchy of Nassau, and the Free City of Frankfurt to form the Prussian Province of Hesse-Nassau.

Today, it forms a part of the German state of Hesse.

Government and administration
The most important administrative body in Hesse-Homburg was the Privy Council (Geheimrat), the members of which were appointed by the Landgrave. On 18 February 1818, Frederick V founded the State Government, which combined all formerly independent state colleges (consistories, chamber, forestry college, college medicum, and court) into a central authority, divided into three deputations. Hesse-Homburg did not adopt a constitution until 1850, in the wake of the 1848 Revolutions.

See also

Rulers of Hesse

References

Hesse
 
Former states and territories of Rhineland-Palatinate
Hesse-Homburg
Hesse-Homburg
Taunus
Upper Rhenish Circle
Early Modern history of Germany
Modern history of Germany
States and territories established in 1622
States and territories disestablished in 1866
1622 establishments in Europe
1866 disestablishments in Europe
1622 establishments in the Holy Roman Empire
1866 disestablishments in Germany
Former monarchies of Europe